Patrick J. "PJ" Hogan (born September 22, 1962) is an American lobbyist and politician from Maryland and a member of the Democratic Party. He was the Vice Chair of the Maryland State Board of Elections from 2014 to 2021. Hogan was a member of the Maryland Senate from District 39, which covers parts of Montgomery County, from January 11, 1995, to August 10, 2007. He was initially elected as a Republican but switched to the Democratic Party in 2000. Hogan resigned from the Senate to become the Vice-Chancellor for Government Relations for the University System of Maryland from August 2007 to September 30, 2015. The position has been described as the chief lobbyist for the university system. He left the university system to work as a lobbyist in Annapolis.

Election results

References

External links
 

1962 births
20th-century American politicians
21st-century American politicians
Indiana University of Pennsylvania alumni
Living people
Democratic Party Maryland state senators
Politicians from Pittsburgh
University System of Maryland people